Maria Manuela Duarte Neto Portugal Ramalho Eanes (born 29 December 1938) was the First Lady of Portugal from 1976 to 1986, as the wife of the President of Portugal, António Ramalho Eanes.

She broke tradition for wives of Portugal's heads of state, by speaking out about taboo issues such as child sexual abuse. In 1983, she founded Instituto de Apoio à Criança (IAC; Institute of Support to the Child). As a law graduate, and at 37 the youngest in her position, she had a different profile to other First Ladies of the country.

In 1977, after the birth of her second son, she declared her position in favour of ending the complete ban on abortion in Portugal. She called abortion "humiliating for the dignity of women" and said that it should only be allowed in medical emergencies.

Honours

Portugal
Grand Cross of the Order of Prince Henry (7 March 1977)

Other countries

 Grand Cross of the Pro Ecclesia et Pontifice (15 July 1980)
 Dame of the Order of Isabella the Catholic (15 July 1980)
 Grand Cross of the Order of Merit of the Federal Republic of Germany (15 July 1980)
 Gold Medal of the Order of the Rose (15 July 1980)
 Grand Cross of the Order of St. Olav (13 October 1980)
 Grand Cross of the Order of the Southern Cross (20 January 1982)
 Grand Cross of the Order of the Crown (17 June 1982)
 First Class of the Order of the Virtues (23 March 1984)
 Grand Cross of the Order of Devotion (16 May 1984)
 Grand Cross of the Order of Adolphe of Nassau (2 January 1985)

References

1938 births
Living people
People from Almada
First Ladies of Portugal
Grand Crosses of the Order of Prince Henry
Dames Grand Cross of the Order of Isabella the Catholic
Grand Crosses 1st class of the Order of Merit of the Federal Republic of Germany
Order of Saint Olav
Grand Crosses of the Order of the Crown (Belgium)